Liberty Oil Co. v. Condon National Bank, 260 U.S. 235 (1922), was a decision by the Supreme Court of the United States dealing with civil procedure and the nature of taking an appeal from the United States District Court.

Factual and procedural background
Liberty Oil Company, a corporation organized under the laws of Virginia contracted to purchase 160 acres, more or less, of oil lands in Butler County, Kansas, for $1,150,000 from the Atlas Petroleum Company of Oklahoma, C. M. Ball, Isadore Litman, P. G. Keith, and J. H. Keith, residents of Kansas. Pursuant to the contract Liberty Oil Company deposited $100,000 in escrow with the Condon National Bank pursuant to the contract. The escrow was pursuant the term of the contract requiring that the vendors furnish an abstract of title to the property showing a good and marketable title in them. Liberty Oil Co. has seven days to review the abstract of title and if it showed good and marketable title Liberty Oil Co. was to pay the remainder of the purchase price and receive the deeds and possession of the land. If the examination showed a good and marketable title, and the vendee should refuse to pay the money then due from it, the $100,000 was to be delivered to the vendors as liquidated damages. In the event that the examination should disclose that the title was not good and marketable, the Liberty Oil was to notify the vendors, and they were to have 30 days in which to perfect the title, and, should they neglect in that time to do so, the $100,000 on deposit was to be returned to the Liberty Oil. In either case the contract was to become null and void. Liberty Oil claims abstract showed that the title of the vendors was not good and marketable, in that in the chain of title the vendors claimed under the deed of an assignee for the benefit of creditors filed in a Colorado court, but never authorized or confirmed by a court of competent jurisdiction under the laws of Kansas, as required by the law of Kansas, that this defect was not remedied by the vendors within the time required.  On July 11, 1918, the plaintiff duly notified Condon National Bank of this and demanded payment of the money deposited. The vendors also demanded the payment of the money deposited. The bank did not pay either.

Liberty Oil brought an action at law against Condon National Bank in the United States District Court for the District of Kansas for the money deposited plus interest. The bank answered admitting the facts alleged except the character of the title.  The bank asked that be discharged from liability in a defensive interpleader  since:
 it claimed no interest in the deposit, 
 offered to pay the sum into court or to such person as the court orders  
 asked the vendors be made parties and required to set up their claim to the deposit
 asked the court make an order as to the disposition of the money, and discharged the bank it be from all liability in connection with the deposit.

The court granted the banks request and the vendors voluntarily appeared, answered, and cross petitioned for the deposits and payment of the purchase price. A jury trial was waived. The court tried the matter and found in a general verdict for the vendors, awarding them the deposit with interest.

Liberty Oil appealed to the Eighth Circuit Court of Appeals claiming the court incorrectly decided the issue of the vendors having good and marketable title. The record of appeal was prepared as either bill of exceptions for writ of error from an action at law or a transcript for an appeal from a suit in equity. The Court of Appeals held that the case was reviewed by writ of error and since the bill of exceptions showed no special findings of fact but only a general finding in a case at law tried without a jury, it lacked power to rule as to the sufficiency of the evidence to sustain the finding so sustained the verdict. Liberty Oil appealed by certiorari to the United States Supreme Court.

Holding of United States Supreme Court 
These statues were a step on the way to merger of law and equity but not as fully as in the states with a code of procedures by creating one form of action.

Judicial Code § 269, as amended  , appellate courts are to give judgment after an examination of the record without regard to technical errors, defects, or exceptions which do not affect the substantial rights of the parties, and Judicial Code § 274b,  provides whether the review is sought by writ of error or appeal, the appellate court is given to render such judgment upon the record as law and justice shall require. It follows that the court should have considered the issue of law and fact upon which the decree of the district court depended whether there was a good and marketable title. The Supreme Court could have determined the issue of whether there was good and marketable title but did not because the case was not of sufficient public interest to justify that, the case was remanded to the Eighth Circuit Court of Appeals.

Subsequent history

The case was determined on remand by the Eighth Circuit Court of Appeals at 291 F. 293 in 1923.

See also 
List of United States Supreme Court cases, volume 260
List of United States Supreme Court cases

References

External links
 [ Official Website of the Supreme Court of the United States]
  

United States Supreme Court cases
United States Supreme Court cases of the Taft Court
United States civil procedure case law
1922 in United States case law
Equitable defenses
United States appellate procedure
Butler County, Kansas